Václav Jurečka (born 26 June 1994) is a professional Czech football forward currently playing for Slavia Prague in the Czech First League.

Career
During the campaign for the 2016–17 Czech Cup, Jurečka scored five goals, becoming the top scorer for his team, Opava. On 26 April 2017, he scored the second goal in Opava's 2–0 win at Mladá Boleslav in the semi-finals, helping his Second League team to defeat their fourth First League opponents in a row and advance to the cup final for the first time in club history.

On 6 January 2020, Jurečka signed with Slovácko.

Slavia Prague
On 4 June 2022, Jurečka signed with Slavia Prague.

Career statistics

Club

References

External links 
 Václav Jurečka official international statistics
 
 Václav Jurečka profile on the SFC Opava official website

1994 births
Living people
Czech footballers
Czech Republic youth international footballers
Czech National Football League players
Czech First League players
SFC Opava players
FK Kolín players
1. FC Slovácko players
Association football forwards
SK Slavia Prague players
Czech Republic international footballers